Galathea is one of the largest genera of squat lobsters, containing 70 currently recognised species (17 in the Atlantic Ocean, 22 in the Indian Ocean and 43 in the Pacific Ocean). Most species of Galathea live in shallow waters.

Species
Galathea contains 70 species:

Galathea aegyptiaca Paul'son, 1875
Galathea albatrossae Baba, 1988
Galathea amamiensis Miyake & Baba, 1966
Galathea amboinensis De Man, 1888
Galathea anepipoda Baba, 1990
Galathea australiensis Stimpson, 1858
Galathea balssi Miyake & Baba, 1964
Galathea bengala Tirmizi & Javed, 1993
Galathea bidens Baba, 1988
Galathea bimaculata Miyake & Baba, 1966
Galathea bolivari Zariquiey Álvarez, 1950
Galathea boninensis Miyake & Baba, 1965
Galathea brevimana Paul'son, 1875
Galathea capillata Miyake & Baba, 1970
Galathea cenarroi Zariquiey Álvarez, 1968
Galathea consobrina De Man, 1902
Galathea corallicola Haswell, 1882
Galathea coralliophilus Baba & Oh, 1990
Galathea cymbulaerostris Tirmizi, 1966
Galathea dispersa Bate, 1859
Galathea faiali Nunes-Ruivo, 1961
Galathea formosa De Man, 1902
Galathea genkai Miyake & Baba, 1964
Galathea guttata Osawa, 2004
Galathea hispida Baba, 2005
Galathea inconspicua Henderson, 1885
Galathea inflata Potts, 1915
Galathea intermedia Liljeborg, 1851
Galathea keijii Tirzimi & Javed, 1993
Galathea kuboi Miyake & Baba, 1967
Galathea labidolepta Stimpson, 1858
Galathea latirostris Dana, 1852
Galathea lenis Baba, 1969
Galathea longimana Paul'son, 1875
Galathea longimanoides Johnson, 1970
Galathea lumaria Baba, 2005
Galathea machadoi Barrois, 1888
Galathea maculiabdominalis Baba, 1972
Galathea magnifica Haswell, 1882
Galathea mauritiana Bouvier, 1914
Galathea multilineata Balss, 1913
Galathea nexa Embleton, 1834
Galathea ohshimai Miyake & Baba, 1967
Galathea omanensis Tirmizi & Javed, 1993
Galathea orientalis Stimpson, 1858
Galathea patae Osawa, 2006
Galathea paucilineata Benedict, 1902
Galathea pilosa De Man, 1888
Galathea platycheles Miyake, 1953
Galathea pubescens Stimpson, 1858
Galathea quinquespinosa (Balss, 1913)
Galathea robusta Baba, 1990
Galathea rostrata A. Milne Edwards 1880
Galathea rubromaculata Miyake & Baba, 1967
Galathea rufipes A. Milne Edwards & Bouvier, 1894
Galathea spinimanus Borradaile, 1900
Galathea spinosorostris Dana, 1852
Galathea squamea Baba, 1979
Galathea squamifera Leach, 1814
Galathea strigosa (Linnaeus, 1761)
Galathea submagnifica Laurie, 1926
Galathea subsquamata Stimpson, 1858
Galathea tanegashimae Baba, 1969
Galathea ternatensis De Man, 1902
Galathea tropis Baba, 2005
Galathea venusta Miyake & Baba, 1970
Galathea vitiensis Dana, 1852
Galathea whiteleggii Grant & McCulloch, 1906
Galathea wolffi Miyake & Baba, 1970
Galathea yamashitai Miyake & Baba, 1967

References

 Macpherson, E.; Robainas-Barcia, A. (2015). Species of the genus Galathea Fabricius, 1793 (Crustacea, Decapoda, Galatheidae) from the Indian and Pacific Oceans, with descriptions of 92 new species. Zootaxa. 3913(1): 1-335

Further reading

Squat lobsters